The 2016–17 Morgan State Bears men's basketball team represented Morgan State University during the 2016–17 NCAA Division I men's basketball season. The Bears, led by 11th-year head coach Todd Bozeman, played their home games at the Talmadge L. Hill Field House in Baltimore, Maryland as members of the Mid-Eastern Athletic Conference. They finished the season 14–16, 11–5 in MEAC play to finish in a tie for third place. They lost in the quarterfinals of the MEAC tournament to Howard.

Previous season
The Bears finished the 2015–16 season 9–22, 6–10 in MEAC play to finish in a three-way tie for ninth place. They beat Maryland Eastern Shore in the first round of the MEAC tournament, before falling to Hampton in the quarterfinals.

Preseason 
The Bears were picked to finish in ninth place in the preseason MEAC poll. Phillip Carr was named to the preseason All-MEAC second team.

Roster

Schedule and results

|-
!colspan=9 style=| Non-conference regular season

|-
!colspan=9 style=| MEAC regular season

|-
!colspan=9 style=| MEAC tournament

References

Morgan State Bears men's basketball seasons
Morgan State
Morgan
Morgan